1 is the debut studio album by German electronic music producer Pole. It was released by Kiff SM and Matador Records in 1998.

Reception

Sean Cooper of AllMusic wrote that Pole's "nine variations on damaged dub minimalism recall the best of Basic Channel techno while steering well clear of the monotony factor", praising 1 as "an excellent debut". In 2017, Pitchfork placed 1 at number 34 on its list of "The 50 Best IDM Albums of All Time".

Track listing

Personnel
 Stefan Betke – production, writing
 Max Dax – art direction

References

1998 debut albums
Pole (musician) albums
Matador Records albums